Naval Outlying Field Webster also Webster Field , is a military base with an airfield. It is a site of the Naval Air Warfare Center Aircraft Division (NAWCAD) serving Navy test pilots and avionics engineering and development, located on the west side of St. Inigoes, Maryland, United States. It is near Coast Guard Station, St. Inigoes.

History
The airfield was located on a Jesuit property owned since 1634. During World War II, the U.S. Navy purchased the land for $96,000 from the priesthood in 1943, paying them one year later. All buildings were demolished with the exception of the Jesuit fathers' residence on Priest's Point, and a tobacco barn near Fort Point. Three runways were originally constructed, though only two remain in use today.

The Naval Air Navigation Electronics Project moved to the field in 1960.

References

Airports in Maryland
Airports established in 1943
1943 establishments in Maryland